Generation for a National Encounter, sometimes known as the GEN Party or simply as GEN, is a centre-left political party in Argentina. It was founded in 2007 by Margarita Stolbizer as a split from the Radical Civic Union, in opposition to the UCR's endorsement of Roberto Lavagna's general election.

The party forms part of the Juntos por el Cambio coalition since 2021. In the 2021 legislative election, Stolbizer herself was elected to the Chamber of Deputies, granting the party representation at the federal level for the first time since 2017.

History
The GEN Party was founded in 2007 by Margarita Stolbizer as a split from the Radical Civic Union (UCR), in opposition to the UCR's endorsement of Roberto Lavagna's presidential candidacy. Since its establishment it has been a junior coalition party in a number of electoral alliances: first, in 2007, it supported the Civic Coalition and its 2007 presidential candidate, Elisa Carrió, alongside other non-peronist progressive parties like the Socialist Party and the ARI. In 2011, GEN joined the Broad Progressive Front (FAP) in support of the Socialist Party's Hermes Binner's presidential run. The FAP would later give way to the Broad Front UNEN, of which the GEN was also a part.

In the 2015 general election Stolbizer herself was nominated to the presidency by the Broad Front UNEN's successor, Progresistas. The bid was unsuccessful and Stolbizer landed fifth with only 2.51% of the popular vote. For the 2017 legislative election, the GEN joined forces with the peronist Renewal Front (FR) to form 1País. Stolbizer and the FR leader Sergio Massa's bid to the Senate was unsuccessful in their home province of Buenos Aires, placing third behind the Cambiemos and Citizen's Unity lists. Following the expiration of Stolbizer's term in the Chamber of Deputies and Jaime Linares's term in the Senate in 2017, the party lost all its representation at the federal level. 

In 2019 the GEN Party broke its alliance with the Renewal Front, which joined the Frente de Todos, and instead formed the Federal Consensus coalition alongside other small parties to support the presidential candidacy of Roberto Lavagna. Lavagna placed third in the contest with a little over 6% of the vote.

Ahead of the 2021 legislative election, the party left Federal Consensus and backed Juntos por el Cambio; Stolbizer herself endorsed the UCR's Facundo Manes in the JxC primary elections.

Electoral performance

President

Chamber of Deputies

Senate

References

External links
Official website (in Spanish)

Political parties established in 2007
2007 establishments in Argentina
Center-left parties in Argentina
Social democratic parties in Argentina